Vladimir Atanasovski was Director of Administration for Security and Counterintelligence of Macedonia from 2016 till 2017.

References

People from Delčevo
1984 births
Living people